The Malta University Historical Society (MUHS) is an undergraduate and graduate student organisation based at the University of Malta with one of MUHS's principal activities is to publish the academic journal Storja. It was founded by Andrew P. Vella in 1963, making it one of Malta's oldest student organisations. The society's main aim during the years was to promote History and Politics knowledge while correcting any sort of misconceptions. The organisation is also known for publishing the journal 'Storja' which was first published in 1978. The latest edition of Storja was published in 2019.

The society is an autonomous, voluntary and non- profitable that works to disseminate historical knowledge, promote historical research and encourage interest in history through lectures, debates, excursions, and publications.
The society facilitates collaboration between undergraduate and graduate history students disseminating information relating to the Discipline and to make representations on behalf of History students in Malta.

Further reading
THE MALTA HISTORICAL SOCIETY, 1 December 1994, read [p. 5] CONTENTS.

References

Academic journals edited by students
University of Malta